Taimoor Sultan (born 4 December 1994) is a Pakistani cricketer who plays for Northern. He made his first-class debut on 23 November 2015, for Sui Northern Gas Pipelines Limited in the 2015–16 Quaid-e-Azam Trophy. In January 2021, he was named in Northern's squad for the 2020–21 Pakistan Cup.

References

External links
 

1994 births
Living people
Pakistani cricketers
Sui Northern Gas Pipelines Limited cricketers
Peshawar Zalmi cricketers
Cricketers from Sargodha